Charlotte Somewhat Crazy is a 1928 German silent comedy film directed by Adolf E. Licho and starring Lya De Putti, Livio Pavanelli, and Alfons Fryland. The film's sets were designed by the art director Franz Schroedter. Location shooting took place in Nice.

Cast

References

Bibliography

External links

1928 films
Films of the Weimar Republic
German silent feature films
Films directed by Adolf E. Licho
1928 comedy films
German comedy films
Films based on German novels
German black-and-white films
Phoebus Film films
Silent comedy films
1920s German films
Films shot in Nice
1920s German-language films